Kaibigan Mo is the third single from Sarah Geronimo's platinum album The Great Unknown, released on February 3, 2017. It was recorded the by Geronimo and Yeng Constantino, the latter wrote the song. This song is the most-streamed track from The Great Unknown album with over 9.7 Million plays on Spotify as of August 29, 2017. Geronimo and Constantino performed the song together for the first time at the 2017 edition of FUSION Music Festival on January 27, 2017.

Music video 
Viva Records released the music video of the song on February 3, 2017. The music video features both Geronimo and Constantino. It reached #1 on both MTV Pinoy and Myx.

Live performances 
Sarah Geronimo and Yeng Constantino performed the song on FUSION Music Festival on January 27, 2017. They also sung the song on ASAP on March 12, 2017. Singer Hanna Flores took over Constantino's part on the hit song for Geronimo's The Great Unknown: Unplugged album show on Kia Theater in November 2016, Flores also join Geronimo for the rest of her The Great Unknown provincial shows to sing the song.

Chart performance 

The song did good on charts, reaching both #1 of MTV Pinoy and Myx charts. It also landed on the first ever Billboard PH Top 20 charting at #18 and peaking at #16.

References 

Sarah Geronimo songs
2017 singles
2015 songs
Tagalog-language songs